Panagiotis Voukelatos (born 7 April 1983 in Patras) is a Greek amateur track cyclist. He has won three men's team sprint titles at the Greek Championships (2004, 2005, and 2006), and later represented his nation Greece at the 2008 Summer Olympics.

Voukelatos qualified for the Greek squad in the men's team sprint at the 2008 Summer Olympics in Beijing by receiving a berth for his team based on the nation's selection process from the UCI Track World Rankings. Teaming with Athanasios Mantzouranis and Vasileios Reppas, Voukelatos recorded a time of 45.645 and a speed of 59.152 km/h to deliver the Greek trio a tenth-place finish in the prelims.

Career highlights

2004
  Greek Championships (Team sprint), Novices (GRE)
  Greek Championships (Team pursuit), Greece
2005
  Greek Championships (Team sprint), Greece
2006
  Greek Championships (Team sprint), Greece
2007
  Athens Open Balkan Championships (Team sprint with Athanasios Mantzouranis and Christos Volikakis), Athens (GRE)
2008
 10th Olympic Games (Team sprint with Athanasios Mantzouranis and Vasileios Reppas), Beijing (CHN)
2012
  Greek Championships (Team sprint), Athens (GRE)

References

External links
NBC 2008 Olympics profile

1983 births
Living people
Greek male cyclists
Greek track cyclists
Cyclists at the 2008 Summer Olympics
Olympic cyclists of Greece
Sportspeople from Patras
21st-century Greek people